Monolink is the stage name of Steffen Linck, a German Liveact, singer-songwriter and electronic dance music producer who specializes in ambient, techno, electronica and house genres.

Music career
A member of the Berlin electronica scene, Monolink quickly broke away from the classic DJ set and instead created his own style with a combination of live vocals and instruments. SF Weekly describes him as a purveyor of "trippy relaxation with a slightly gravelly, Teutonic voice". Monolink collaborated with other electronic acts, including Acid Pauli.

Monolink released his debut album, Amniotic, in 2018. The recording combines the tradition of singer-songwriting with electronic dance music, where techno, electronica and ambient genres blend with influences of Leonard Cohen and Bob Dylan. Two singles from the release, "Sirens" and "Swallow" appeared at No. 1 spot in the iTunes Electronic (Germany). A review in EDM Identity describes the songs from the album as consisting of "hypnotic beats and vocals" and as "a blend of both deep and happy melodic sounds".

Discography

Albums 
 Amniotic (2018)
 Under Darkening Skies (2021)

Singles 
 The End (with Acid Pauli) (2015)
 Sirens (2017)
 Swallow (2018)
 Father Ocean (2018)
 Rearrange My Mind (2019)
 Black Hole (with Ben Böhmer) (2019)
 Sinner (2020)
 Otherside (2020)
 The Prey (2021)
 Harlem River/Falling (2021)
 Turning Away (2021)
 Don't Hold Back (2021)
 Beyond Control (with NTO) (2021)

References

External links

, 2014 live recording, via official YouTube channel

Living people
German record producers
German DJs
German singer-songwriters
German electronic musicians
Electronic dance music DJs
Year of birth missing (living people)